KIXM (92.3 FM, iMix 92.3) is a radio station broadcasting a Top 40 (CHR) format. Licensed to Victor, Idaho, United States, the station is currently owned by Jackson Radio Group, Inc.

History
The station was assigned the callsign KMQS on 1997-08-14. On 2006-04-03, the station changed its call sign to KYPT and on 2006-10-27 to KRVQ. On 2010-06-23, to the current KIXM.

References

External links

IXM
Contemporary hit radio stations in the United States